Khwaja Sayyad Abdullah Chishti was a 16th century Sufi Saint of Chishti order and a direct descendant of Khwajah Maudood Chishti.

Early life
He was born in Old Bhakkhar, Sindh and he received his initial education from the scholars of his family.

Name and lineage
His ism (given name) is Khwajah Abdullah Chishti and he was bestowed with the titles of Qutb-ul-Asr, Qutb e Bihar, Fani Fillah and Peerzada e Chisht.

Nasab (patronymic)

Hazrat Khwajah Sayyad Abdullah Chishti bin Khwajah Sayyad Asadullah Chishti bin Khwajah Sayyad Burhan Uddin Chishti bin Khwajah Sayyad Abdur Rahman Chishti bin Khwajah Sayyad Mohammad Jaan Chishti bin Khwajah Sayyad Sam’aan Sani Chishti bin Khwajah Sayyad Mansoor Chishti bin Khwajah Sayyad Qutub Uddin Maudood Chishti.

Arrival in Bihar 
Khwaja Abdullah Chishti began his journey from Old Bhakkhar and after making pilgrimage to various Mashaikh, he finally arrived at the shrine of Makhdoom Jahan Sheikh Sharf Uddin Ahmad Yahya Maneri. There he had a spiritual meeting with Makhdoom Jahan and it was revealed upon him to make Sheikhpura his permanent abode from where he would propagate the commandments of Allah.

Sayyad Shah Hussain Uddin Gayawi says:

After the persistent stay of Khwajah Abdullah Chishti in Sheikhpura, the regional king allocated a small piece of land called Baithka on an elevated topography as a tribute. A Khanquah and a mosque were also constructed here by Khwajah Abdullah Chishti.

Khwajah Kuaan
After the arrival of Khwajah Abdullah Chishti, a well was formed at the place from where the fountain sprang out. Hence it is named after Khwajah Abdullah Chishti and is famous in the region by the name of Khwajah Kuaan. For centuries the pilgrims of the shrine of Chishti are taking water from the well and are benefited from its healing properties. The Khwajah Kuaan is still well preserved and is located beside the main road leading to the Khanqah.

Tasawwuf
Khwaja Abdullah Chishti gave Bay'ah to his father Sayyad Asadullah Chishti and was his authorized disciple who was a Sufi saint of Chishtia Nizamia order. He also received the khilafat  of Chishtia Qutubia order  through his great grandfather Sayyad Mohammad Jaan Chishti who was a disciple of Khwajah Qutub Uddin Bakhtiyar Kaki.

Khwaja Abdullah Chishti authorized a number of people to be his disciples including Sayyad Qutub Uddin Sani Chishti, Sayyad Nasir Uddin Chishti and Sayyad Aashique Chishti.

Death and legacy 
Khwajah Abdullah Chishti died on 14th of Rajab and his death anniversary is celebrated with great magnificence. His grave is located in Chhota Sheikhpura, Nawada, a city in Indian state of Bihar.
His teachings were further spread by his descendants. His two notable descendants are mentioned below:
 Taj Mahmood Haqqani
 Ahmad Hussain Chishti

Family life
He had two sons and one daughter from one of his wife Bibi Rukn. His elder son is Khwajah Sayyad Nasir Uddin Chishti and the younger is named Khwajah Sayyad Qutub Uddin Qutub Sani Chishti. His daughter Bibi Swaleha was married to Sayyad Aashique Chishti who was also a disciple of Khwajah Abdullah Chishti.

List of Sajjadah Nashin
All the Sajjadah Nashin of this Khanqah are the direct descendant of Khwaja Abdullah Chishti. Their name are mentioned below in chronological order.
 Sayyad Qutubuddin Sani Chishti
 Khwaja Taj Mahmood Haqqani
 Khwaja Sayyad Inayatullah Chishti
 Khwaja Sayyad Fasih Chishti
 Khwaja Sayyad Malih Chishti
 Khwaja Sayyad Rahman Chishti
 Khwaja Sayyad Fakhruddin Chishti
 Khwaja Sayyad Shuja'at Hussain Chishti
 Khwaja Sayyad Ahmad Hussain Chishti
 Khwaja Sayyad Sultan Ahmad Chishti
 Khwaja Sayyad Qutubuddin Ahmad Chishti
 Mawlana Sayyad Ainuddin Chishti

Notes

References 

Sufis
Chishtis
Chishti Order
Indian Sufi saints
16th-century Indian Muslims
Indian Sunni Muslims
Indian Sunni Muslim scholars of Islam
Sufi shrines in India